Harry Brus (born April 1949, in Graz, Austria) is an Australian bass player and guitarist, best known for his work with Matt Finish, Kevin Borich, Renée Geyer, Australian Crawl, Leo Sayer, Marcia Hines, Jimmy Barnes, Ross Wilson and Billy Thorpe.

Thredbo Blues Festival describes Harry Brus as "a unique stylist" and he is widely recognized as "a powerful and sensitive player" with "tons of credibility".

History

1960s
Harry "The Doctor" Brus arrived in Australia at the age of seven from Graz, Austria where his music career started in 1964, inspired by James Jamerson, Hank Marvin and The Beatles.

In 1965, Brus' band The Amazons signed a record deal with Festival subsidiary Leedon Records and since then he has continued to work as a professional musician. Another band member of The Amazons also included John Cave.

In 1967, he played lead guitar with pop idol Johnny Young and later joined Tony Gaha and The in People, featuring Ron Barry and Janice Slater. During this period he was recruited for the original lineup of the Dave Miller Set but left the band soon after it formed.

In the late sixties, Brus teamed up with Geoff Oakes playing soul music.

Brus also performed bass guitar in the stage musical Hair, before forming the band Birth with jazz pianist Roger Frampton and English drummer Tony Hicks from Backdoor.

1970s
In 1970, Brus joined Jeff St John & Copperwine, who had a top five Australian hit single with Teach Me How To Fly.

Also in 1970, he recorded a live album with Australian blues singer Wendy Saddington, Live at Walacia.

This was followed by stints with Blackfeather, Dave Miller Set, Ross Wilson, Little Sammy and The in People, Birth, Hunger, Mother Earth, The Bobby Gebert Trio, Fender Benders, Foreday Riders, Duffhead, The Healers, Phil Jones and The Unknown Blues Band.

Brus then began long-term relationships as bass player with Renée Geyer and Kevin Borich.

In the late 1970s, Brus joined the Barry Leef Band, featuring guitarist Stevie Housden, and they had a residency at the Musicians Club in Sydney for two years.

1980s
During the Eighties, Brus toured and recorded with Kevin Borich, Renée Geyer, Marcia Hines, Joe Walsh, Phil Emmanuel, Ross Wilson and Russell Morris.

In 1985, Brus became a member of Australian Crawl and recorded Between a Rock and a Hard Place.

Other highlights include jamming with Leon Russell, Billy Preston and Ron Wood.

1990s
During the nineties, Brus toured and recorded with Kevin Borich, Renée Geyer, Jimmy Barnes, Billy Thorpe, Brian Cadd and was bass guitarist in the house band on the highly successful Long Way to the Top tour and album.

2000s
Brus continues to tour and record with Kevin Borich and Leo Sayer. He is a regular performer at the annual Thredbo Blues Festival and has recorded and toured with James Southwell and Gail Page.

In 2007, he joined Matt Finish with John Prior and recorded bass guitar and vocals on their 1978 – 2008 album and New Frontier EP.

Equipment
Fender precision bass guitar
Spector bass guitar
Fender Rhodes electric piano

Discography
1966 The Amazons / Ain’t That Lovin' You Baby b/w You’d Better Mind
1967 Dave Miller Set / Why? Why? Why? b/w Hard Hard Year
1968 Dave Miller Set / Hope b/w Having A Party and Let's Get Together" b/w A Bread and Butter Day1968 Dave Miller Set / Dave Miller Set EP
1970 Jeff St John and the Copperwine / Teach Me How To Fly1971 Wendy Saddington and Copperwine / Live at Wallacia1973 Renée Geyer with Mother Earth / Renée Geyer
1979 Kevin Borich / Australian Guitar Compilation1985 Australian Crawl / Between a Rock and a Hard Place1986 Renée Geyer / Live at the Basement1993 Renée Geyer / Seven Deadly Sins (ABC TV mini-series soundtrack)
1998 Kevin Borich / Heart Starter2001 Russell Morris / Gimme Ted live DVD
2001 Renée Geyer / Women at the Well – Songs of Paul Kelly2002 Various Artists / Long Way to the Top Australian tour CD and DVD
2004 Kevin Borich / Nomad2005 Jimmy Barnes / Double Happiness
2006 James Southwell Band / Dark Angel2006 Leo Sayer / Live in Melbourne2008 Matt Finish / 1978 – 20082009 Matt Finish / New Frontier''

References

External links
Harry Brus on MySpace
What's On Central Coast gig and CD reviews
Thredbo Blues Festival
Harry Brus video

 at John Prior's Unity Gain Studios in Sydney

Australian Crawl Australian Music History database

1949 births
Living people
Australian rock bass guitarists
Male bass guitarists
Australian male composers
Australian composers
Australian male guitarists